Samba Adama (born 12 November 1955) is a Mauritanian freestyle and Greco-Roman wrestler.

Adama competed for Mauritania at the 1988 Summer Olympics in both disciplines of wrestling, but lost both group matches in each discipline by falls, so he didn't advance to the next round in either.

References

External links
 

1955 births
Living people
Olympic wrestlers of Mauritania
Wrestlers at the 1988 Summer Olympics
Mauritanian male sport wrestlers